"Jellyhead" is a song released by British duo, Crush in February 1996. The song peaked at number 50 in the United Kingdom, 72 in the United States and 32 in Australia.

Track listings 
 European CD single/Cassingle (Telstar – CDSTAS2809)
 "Jellyhead" (Radio Edit) - 3:36
 "Jellyhead" (Motiv8's Pumphouse 7" Edit) - 4:25
 "Jellyhead" (Motiv8's Pumphouse Remix) - 7:22
 "Jellyhead" (Motiv8's Dubhouse Remix) - 7:19
 "Jellyhead" (Double Dust Remix) - 7:06
 "Jellyhead" (Oven Ready Remix) - 6:42

 Australian/ New Zealand CD single (Central Station – CSR CD5 0200)
 "Jellyhead" (Motiv8's Pumphouse 7" Edit) - 4:22
 "Jellyhead" (Motiv 8's Pumphouse Extended Mix) - 7:19
 "Jellyhead" (Oven Ready Remix) - 6:42
 "Jellyhead" (Pop Version) - 3:32

Charts

References 

1996 singles
1996 songs